Robert Lemaignen (15 March 1893 – 3 April 1980) was a right-wing French European Commissioner.

He was appointed as one of the first French European Commissioners on the first Hallstein Commission from 1958 to 1962. He did not remain a member of the second Hallstein commission and was succeeded as commissioner by Henri Rochereau. Lemaignen had responsibility for Overseas development.

Lemaignen had previously been the vice-president of the French employers federation (with extensive African experience).

References

External links
 NATIONAL BANK OF BELGIUM, August 2004 Working Paper on Macroeconomic and Monetary policy-making at the European Commission 1957 to 1969
  Robert Lemaignen 1960 document on the association of Overseas Territories with the European Community

|-

|-

1893 births
1980 deaths
French European Commissioners
European Commissioners 1958–1962